Vijay Sai, also known as Potti Vijay, was an Indian comedian who works in Telugu-language films.

Career 
Vijay Sai made his film debut with Ammayilu Abbayilu (2003) before starring in Backpocket that same year. He played the lead role in both films. He has since starred in sixty films including Bommarillu (2006) and Current (2009).

Personal life 
In 2006, he married television actress N. Vanitha Reddy. He had been living separately from his wife, N. Vanitha Reddy, since 2015.

Selected filmography

Death 
On 11 December 2017, Vijay Sai hanged himself on a ceiling fan. He was aged 38 at his death. He had recorded a video before his death citing his wife and two other people demanded 3 crore Indian rupees from him.

References

External links 

Telugu comedians
Male actors in Telugu cinema
Indian male film actors
21st-century Indian male actors
2017 deaths
Year of birth missing
Artists who committed suicide
Filmed suicides
Filmed deaths in Asia
Suicides by hanging in India
2017 suicides